Afropterogramma is a genus of flies belonging to the family Lesser Dung flies.

Species
A. minor Papp, 2008

References

Sphaeroceridae
Diptera of Africa
Brachycera genera